Dominique Danyell Canty (born March 2, 1977) is an American professional women's basketball player, most recently with the Washington Mystics in the WNBA.

High School and College
Born in Chicago, Illinois, Canty attended Whitney Young High School, where she was named a High School All-American by the WBCA. She participated in the WBCA  High School All-America Game in 1995, scoring seventeen points.

After graduating from High School, where she was a 1995 Street & Smith All-American and a four-time All-State player, Canty attended the University of Alabama and majored in criminal justice with a minor in social work while spending four seasons with Alabama Crimson Tide women's basketball.

In her senior year, she was named First-Team All-American by the Associated Press and The Sporting News.

She finished her collegiate career as a two-time All-American and four-time All-SEC selection, and averaged 18.1 points, 7.2 rebounds and 3.6 assists during her four seasons with the Alabama Crimson Tide.

By the time she graduated, Canty finished her career as the school's all-time leading scorer—male or female.

Team statistics
Source

WNBA career
Canty was drafted 29th overall in the 3rd round during the 1999 WNBA Draft by the Detroit Shock.  She was the runner-up in the 1999 WNBA Rookie of the Year voting.

After playing four seasons with the Shock, she was traded to the Houston Comets on April 28, 2003 in exchange for the draft rights to Allison Curtin (Houston's 2003 first-round draft choice).

Like most WNBA players during the off-season, Canty kept active in basketball at various levels.  When she was with the Detroit Shock, she served the 1999–2000 off-season in their public relations department as an intern.  A year later, she worked as an intern in the public relations department of the Dallas Mavericks NBA team.

After the 2001 WNBA season ended, she served as an assistant coach for the Chicago State University women's basketball team.

On February 12, 2007, the Chicago Sky signed her as a free agent.

NWBL career
Canty played with the Chicago Blaze of the National Women's Basketball League prior to the 2003 WNBA season.

International career
2004–2005: Bnei Yehuda Tel Aviv (Israel)
2005–2006: Hapoel Tel Aviv (Israel), won the League Championship.
2006–2007: Canty also played in a professional league (PLKK) in Poland for TS Wisła Can-Pack Kraków. In 2007, she won the championship with the team and was voted the season's MVP averaging 11.9 points per game. She is currently playing for them during the 2008–09 WNBA off-season.
2007–2008: Lotos PKO BP Gdynia – 12.3 points per game.
2008–2009: TS Wisla Can-Pack Kraków

Notes

External links 

Press release on Canty signing with the Chicago Sky

1977 births
Living people
Alabama Crimson Tide women's basketball players
All-American college women's basketball players
American women's basketball coaches
American expatriate basketball people in Israel
American expatriate basketball people in Poland
American women's basketball players
Basketball coaches from Illinois
Chicago Sky players
Detroit Shock players
Houston Comets players
Parade High School All-Americans (girls' basketball)
Shooting guards
Small forwards
Sportspeople from Chicago
Whitney M. Young Magnet High School alumni
Basketball players from Chicago